Arbach is a river of Baden-Württemberg, Germany. It is a left tributary of the Neckar near Hirschau.

See also
List of rivers of Baden-Württemberg

Rivers of Baden-Württemberg
Rivers of Germany